Iosevka is a monospace programming typeface, built declaratively using custom typeface generation software, and with an emphasis on compatibility with CJK characters. It is available under a FOSS license. The default builds are available in two styles of nine weights each, and come with italic and oblique versions. The typeface was designed, however, to be easily configurable by editing textual TOML configuration files in the custom generation software.

The character repertoire covers a significant portion of the Basic Multilingual Plane of Unicode, and a few characters from the Enclosed Alphanumeric Supplement block.

History 

The first version of Iosevka, then named codexHW, was created on 19 July 2015, and renamed to Iosevka three days later. It is the product of Chinese typographer Renzhi Li, using the Romanised pseudonym Belleve Invis.

Features 

Iosevka once was a condensed font only, suitable to use with double width CJK characters, using a slashed zero by default. It contains many ligatures, especially suited towards functional programming languages such as Coq, Idris, and Haskell. The variant Iosevka Term is designed to better support terminals and the variant Iosevka Fixed omits the ligatures. It also comes with OpenType features including stylistic sets and character variants.

A second width variant (oddly named Extended) expands all glyphs to easier readable proportions (7 by 10), and also proportionally spaced font variants are included now. Notably, all variants of the Iosevka font family cover the same set of 5013 unicode character points, plus 4 long arrows which do not belong to all variants.

Build process 

One major characteristic of Iosevka is that it is generated from declarative data files using a multi-phase build process. It was originally created as a typeface that could be used with a package called node-sfnt:

As I maintaining node-sfnt , a low-level library used to parse and generate TTFs in Node.JS, I decided to make a programming font using it. Iosevka is generated from a program written by me, as well as a set of parameters, pretty like Computer Modern, but in a more modern way. [...] [C]reating a font actually needs a domain-specific language, like Knuth's METAFONT language. With PatEL's macro system I can easily turn PatEL into a DSL while remaining its full ability of programming. The PatEL is in another repository I created, though not documented yet. It's syntax is basically a Lisp with improvements reducing brackets (by using colons and indents), and supporting infix operators.

As of 2018, the data files are still written in the Patrisika Example Language, also known as PatEL. PatEL is an alternative s-expression format somewhat akin to the wisp of SRFI 119. The PatEL data is then converted into SpiderMonkey abstract syntax tree using another library called Patrisika. The abstract syntax tree is then converted into JavaScript using Escodegen.

See also 

 PragmataPro, a Monospaced font with a design similar to Iosevka

References

External links 

 Iosevka official releases, github.com
 Discussion on Hacker News (2017), news.ycombinator.com
 Discussion on Reddit (2017), reddit.com
 Iosevka Term package for Arch Linux, aur.archlinux.org
 Review by Luc Devroye, luc.devroye.org

Free software Unicode typefaces
Monospaced typefaces
Unicode typefaces
Typefaces and fonts introduced in 2015